Novoturayevo (Yañı Turay) is a rural locality (a selo) in Beketovsky Selsoviet, Yermekeyevsky District, Bashkortostan, Russia. The population was 269 as of 2010. There are 4 streets.

Geography 
Novoturayevo is located 49 km southeast of Yermekeyevo (the district's administrative centre) by road. Novoshakhovo is the nearest rural locality.

References 

Rural localities in Yermekeyevsky District